Randy Gatewood (born January 31, 1973) is a former American football wide receiver in the National Football League and Arena Football League. He was signed by the Miami Dolphins as an undrafted free agent in 1995. He played college football at UNLV. He shares the single game record for most receptions with 23 catches,  which he accomplished on Sept. 17, 1994 against the Idaho Vandals.

Gatewood also played for the Arizona Rattlers. On March 25, 2002, Gatewood re-signed with the Rattlers.

In 2015, Gatewood became a sideline analyst for CBS Sports Network's AFL coverage.

References

External links
AFL bio

1973 births
Living people
American football wide receivers
UNLV Rebels football players
Miami Dolphins players
Arizona Rattlers players
People from Wichita Falls, Texas
Players of American football from Texas